Since 2004, Art on the Underground has commissioned artists to create covers for London Underground's pocket Tube map. These free maps are one of the largest public art commissions in the UK. Over 35 different designs have been produced, with designs from a wide variety of British and international artists. Around 2 million maps are printed for each cover, down from a high of around 12 million in the early 2010s. In 2014, The Guardian published a pictorial survey of the first 10 years' designs, and The Londonist has a survey up to 2017. Between 2016 and 2018, there were also a series of covers for Night Tube.

Tube map covers

Night Tube map covers

References

Public art in London
Transport design in London
Art on the Underground Tube map covers